HD 128198 is a giant star in the northern constellation of Boötes.

References

External links
 HR 5448
 Image HD 128198

Boötes
128198
071277
K-type giants
5448
Durchmusterung objects